Kipling Avenue is a street in the cities of Toronto and Vaughan in Ontario, Canada. It is a concession road, 6 concessions (12 km) west from Yonge Street, and is a major north–south arterial road. It consists of three separate sections, with total combined length of 26.4 km. (16.4 mi.).

The street travels through the district of Etobicoke and serves areas such as New Toronto, Etobicoke Centre, Richview, and Rexdale, passing through residential neighbourhoods and pockets of industrial and commercial areas. The Toronto Transit Commission's 45 Kipling, 44 Kipling South, 944 Kipling South Express and 945 Kipling Express bus routes operate from Kipling Station on the Bloor-Danforth line. These surface routes provide service along the length of the road.

Film studio complex Kipling Studio located on 777 Kipling Avenue is part of Cinespace Film Studios.

History
 

Originally named Mimico Avenue, the street was surveyed in 1795 as a Meridian road south of the east-west Meridian (now Rathburn Road) with lots to the east running east–west and lots to the west running north–south, the street became a central street for the lake shore municipalities of New Toronto (in which it is situated) and Long Branch. It is believed (but unproven) that the street was named in honour of Rudyard Kipling, author of such works as The Jungle Book and the Just So Stories, in preparation for a planned visit to Woodbridge in 1907. Kipling cancelled at the last moment, but the street retained the name.

The Kipling Avenue section in the Town of New Toronto also reverted to its alternate name, Eighteenth Street, at least twice. The section in Woodbridge, was named Eighth Avenue.

Kipling Avenue was extended south of Lake Shore Boulevard West with the development of the former Lakeshore Psychiatric Hospital grounds. In 2001 City Council renamed the southerly extension as "Colonel Samuel Smith Park Drive", after rejecting the City Surveyor's original suggestion of Eighteenth Street.

The Six Points interchange with Bloor and Ontario's early Toronto-to-Hamilton highway, now Dundas has traditionally been Etobicoke's central intersection. In 1953 Etobicoke left York County and joined the newly formed Metropolitan Toronto launching a period of urbanization which included changing the Six Points intersection to use a number of bridges in 1961. In 2017, construction started on a project to remove the interchange and replace it with at-grade intersections. In March 2019, the interchange was closed and the bridges were removed.

Landmarks
Sights along Kipling Avenue in Toronto (north to south):
 North Humber Park
 North Kipling Park
 North Kipling Junior Middle School
 North Albion Collegiate Institute
 Albion Centre
 Albion Arena
 Toronto Public Library Rexdale branch
 Kipling Heights Plaza
 Toronto Public Library Northern Elms branch
 Mississauga Private School
 Monsignor Percy Johnson C.S.S.
 Etobicoke North GO Station
 Westway Plaza
 Dixon Grove Junior Middle School
 Denfield Park
 Islington Golf Club
 Six Points interchange
 Kipling subway station
 Kipling GO Station
 Kipling-Queensway Mall
 Mimico Correctional Centre
 New Toronto Secondary School, now Lakeshore Collegiate Institute
 Humber College Lakeshore campus
 Father John Redmond Catholic Secondary School
 Colonel Samuel Smith Park

Beyond Toronto
Kipling Avenue remains one of two streets to go north of Steeles Avenue (due to the short southward bend of Steeles) and still be within the City of Toronto (the other being Midland Avenue). It ends abruptly at the Toronto-Vaughan border. North of that border, Kipling is a broken street and appears briefly from Highway 7 to Langstaff Road. Its original alignment becomes Clarence Street until Major Mackenzie Road. It begins abruptly again south of Teston Road before finally terminating at King-Vaughan Road.

See also
 Kipling Collegiate Institute

References

External links
Google Maps of Kipling Avenue

Roads in Toronto
Roads in the Regional Municipality of York
Transport in Etobicoke